Chengguan Township (城关乡) could refer to:

Fujian
Chengguan Township, Mingxi County, in Mingxi County, Sanming

Gansu 
 Chengguan Township in Tianshui, Gansu

Guangxi
Chengguan Township, Luzhai County, in Luzhai County, Liuzhou

Henan
Chengguan Township, Xingyang, in Xingyang City
Chengguan Township, Xinzheng, in Xinzheng City
Chengguan Township, Fengqiu County, in Fengqiu County, Xinxiang
Chengguan Township, Lankao County, in Lankao County, Kaifeng
Chengguan Township, Luoning County, in Luoning County, Luoyang
Chengguan Township, Shangshui County, Zhoukou
Chengguan Township, Ye County, in Ye County, Pingdingshan
Chengguan Township, Yiyang County, Henan, in Yiyang County, Luoyang

Liaoning
Chengguan Manchu Ethnic Township (城关满族乡), in Yi County, Jinzhou

Shanxi
Chengguan Township, Datong, in Nanjiao District, Datong
Chengguan Township, Jiexiu, in Jiexiu City
Chengguan Township, Shouyang County, in Shouyang County, Jinzhong
Chengguan Township, Taigu County, in Taigu County, Jinzhong

Xinjiang
Chengguan Township, Yengisar County, in Yengisar County, Kashgar Prefecture

Township name disambiguation pages